Blackheath Hill was a railway station between the Greenwich and Lewisham areas in south-east London. It was opened in 1871 by the London, Chatham and Dover Railway (LCDR) on its Greenwich Park Branch Line. Blackheath Hill was at the end of the line until an extension to  opened in 1888.

The station closed in 1917 along with the rest of the line, owing to low usage and economy measures during World War I. The station building beside the A2 road was demolished in the mid-1980s, and the site has since been entirely built over. Whilst the building work was being undertaken the retaining wall and tunnel under the A2 were visible.

References

Disused railway stations in the Royal Borough of Greenwich
Railway stations in Great Britain opened in 1871
Railway stations in Great Britain closed in 1917
Former London, Chatham and Dover Railway stations